Miss Bahia is a Brazilian Beauty pageant which selects the representative for the State of Bahia at the Miss Brazil contest. The pageant was created in 1954 and has been held every year since with the exception of 1990, 1993, and 2020. The pageant is held annually with representation of several municipalities. Since 2021, the State director of Miss Bahia is, Victor Lins Gonçalves. Bahia has won three crowns in the national contest and also the state that produced the second and most recent Miss Brazil to win the Miss Universe contest, Martha Vasconcellos of Salvador.

The following women from who competed as Miss Bahia have won Miss Brazil:

Marta Rocha, from Salvador, in 1954
Olívia Rebouças Cavalcanti, from Itabuna, in 1962
Marta Vasconcellos, from Salvador, in 1968

Gallery of Titleholders

Results Summary

Placements
Miss Brazil: Martha Rocha (1954);  (1962); Martha Vasconcellos (1968)
1st Runner-Up: Laura Oliveira (1978); Vanessa Blumenfeld (1988); Vanessa Gabriella Rocha (2011); Maria Isabel Santos (2018)
2nd Runner-Up: Maria Manso Dias (1959); Zaída Costa (1975); Cristiane Andrade (1996); Priscila Santiago (2013)
3rd Runner-Up: 
4th Runner-Up: Stella Rocha (1961); Jerusa Ribeiro (1977); Isacarla Petri (1994); Juliana Mendonça (2006)
Top 5/Top 8/Top 9: Marilda Mascarenhas (1965); Ana Moreira (1970)
Top 10/Top 11/Top 12: Geórgia Rejane Mendes (1979); Silvana Batista (1983); Ana Cristina Miranda (1984); Marisabel Böre (1985); Morgana Campos Brasil (1986); Cynara Fernandes (1987); Bianca Queiróz Rocha (1989); Nathalie Maria Duarte (1992); Jussana Moreira Sena (1998); Halina Francisca (2000); Oldeane Fonseca (2001); Bárbara Fernandes (2002); Karoline Araújo de Souza (2004); Danielle Abrantes (2005); Renata Marzolla Costa (2007); Paloma Garzedim Vega (2009); Patrícia Cristiane Guerra (2015); Amanda Malaquias Barreto (2022)
Top 15/Top 16: Rafaela Santos (2010); Victoria Esteves (2016); Caroline Oliveira (2017); Tainara Costa (2021)

Special Awards
Miss Congeniality: Bianca Rocha (1989); Bárbara Fernandes (2002); Danielle Abrantes (2005)
Miss Photogenic: Martha Vasconcellos (1968)

Titleholders

Table Notes

References

External links
Official Miss Brasil Website

Women in Brazil
Bahia
Miss Brazil state pageants